Noterophila may refer to:
 Bignonia noterophila, a flowering plant species
 Noterophila (fly), a synonym for Camilla, a fly genus